Gregory Moore (born March 26, 1984) is an American professional ice hockey coach and former player. He is the current head coach of the Toronto Marlies of the American Hockey League. He previously played in the National Hockey League (NHL) for the New York Rangers and Columbus Blue Jackets and for the Augsburger Panther of the German Deutsche Eishockey Liga (DEL).

In 2018, he was named the head coach of the Chicago Steel in the United States Hockey League (USHL), a Tier I junior league. In 2019, he was named head coach of the Toronto Marlies.

Playing career
Moore was drafted in the 5th round, 143rd overall in the 2003 NHL Entry Draft by the Calgary Flames. He played his college hockey at the University of Maine.

On March 6, 2004, he was acquired by the Rangers, along with Jamie McLennan and Blair Betts, in exchange for Chris Simon and a seventh round choice in the 2004 NHL Entry Draft.

In the 2007–08 season, Moore made his NHL debut with the Rangers in a 2–1 victory against the Tampa Bay Lightning on November 21, 2007.

On July 6, 2009, Moore signed a one-year contract with the New York Islanders. Moore was then assigned to affiliate, the Bridgeport Sound Tigers, in the AHL for the beginning of the 2009–10 season. On March 1, 2010, Moore was traded by the Islanders to the Columbus Blue Jackets for Dylan Reese. Initially reassigned to the Blue Jackets AHL affiliate, the Syracuse Crunch, Moore was later recalled to finish the season with Columbus and made his debut in a 3–2 defeat to the Washington Capitals on April 3, 2010.

On July 9, 2010, Moore signed as a free agent to a one-year contract with the Philadelphia Flyers.

On February 28, 2011, Moore was traded by Philadelphia along with Lewiston Maineiacs player and Flyer prospect, Michael Chaput in returning to Columbus for Tom Sestito.

On July 18, 2011, German professional ice hockey team Augsburger Panther from Augsburg, Bavaria, announced that Moore signed a one-year contract. In his solitary season in 2011–12 with Augsburg, Moore provided 20 goals in 52 games, helping the team to the Qualifying playoff round.

Upon the expiration of his contract with the Panthers, Moore signed a one-year contract with fellow DEL competitor Grizzly Adams Wolfsburg on April 3, 2012. In February 2013 the contract was extended for another year.

Before the 2014–15 season, he signed a contract in the Czech 1st Liga with the Piráti Chomutov before returning to Augsburger Panther in Germany.

Coaching career

Chicago Steel 
On June 6, 2018, Moore was hired as the head coach of the USHL Chicago Steel and led them to the Clark Cup Finals in his first year, before starting off the 2019-20 season with a 15-4-1 record.

Toronto Marlies 
On December 1, 2019, Moore was hired by the Toronto Maple Leafs organization to coach the Toronto Marlies. He replaced Sheldon Keefe, who was promoted to serve as the Leafs head coach.

Career statistics

Regular season and playoffs

International

Awards and honors

References

External links
 

1984 births
Adirondack Phantoms players
American ice hockey coaches
American men's ice hockey right wingers
Augsburger Panther players
Bridgeport Sound Tigers players
Calgary Flames draft picks
Columbus Blue Jackets players
Hartford Wolf Pack players
Ice hockey people from Maine
Living people
Maine Black Bears men's ice hockey players
New York Rangers players
People from Lisbon, Maine
Piráti Chomutov players
Springfield Falcons players
Syracuse Crunch players
Grizzlys Wolfsburg players
Toronto Marlies coaches
AHCA Division I men's ice hockey All-Americans
American expatriate ice hockey players in the Czech Republic
American expatriate ice hockey players in Germany
American expatriate ice hockey people in Canada
Saint Dominic Academy (Maine) alumni